Sonia Mary Brownell (25 August 1918 – 11 December 1980), better known as Sonia Orwell, was the second wife of writer George Orwell. Sonia is believed to be the model for Julia, the heroine of Nineteen Eighty-Four.

Sonia collaborated with the Information Research Department (IRD), a propaganda department of the British Foreign Office, which helped to increase the international fame of Animal Farm and Nineteen Eighty-Four. With her support, the IRD was able to translate Animal Farm into over 16 languages, and for British embassies to disseminate the book in over 14 countries for propaganda purposes. Soon after her husband's death, Sonia sold the film rights to Animal Farm to the American Central Intelligence Agency (CIA). This deal resulted in the creation of the propaganda film Animal Farm (1954), which became the first feature length animated film made in Britain.

Early life
Brownell was born in Calcutta, British India, the daughter of a British colonial official. Her father died when she was four years old. When she was six, she was sent to the Sacred Heart Convent in Roehampton (now part of Roehampton University), in England. She left at 17 and, after learning French in Switzerland, took a secretarial course. As a young woman, Brownell was responsible for transcribing and editing the copy text for the first edition of the Winchester Le Morte d'Arthur, as assistant to the eminent medievalist at Manchester University, Eugène Vinaver.

Orwell
Brownell first met Orwell when she worked as the assistant to Cyril Connolly, a friend of his from Eton College, at the literary magazine Horizon. After the death of his first wife Eileen O'Shaughnessy, Orwell became desperately lonely. On 13 October 1949, he married Brownell, only three months before his death from tuberculosis.

George Orwell's friends, as well as various Orwell experts, have noted that Brownell helped Orwell through the painful last months of his life and, according to Anthony Powell, cheered Orwell up greatly. However, others have argued that she may have also been attracted to him primarily because of his fame. Orwell biographer Bernard Crick told The Washington Post he did not think that Brownell "had much influence on his life" and asserted that "it was more or less an accident that they married."

Nineteen Eighty-Four
T. R. Fyvel, who was a colleague and friend of George Orwell during the last decade of the writer's life, and other friends of Orwell, have said that Sonia was the model for Julia, the heroine of Nineteen Eighty-Four, the "girl from the fiction department" who brings love and warmth to the middle-aged hero, Winston Smith.

As Orwell wrote in Nineteen Eighty-Four, "the girl from the fiction department... was looking at him... She was very young, he thought, she still expected something from life... She would not accept it as a law of nature that the individual is always defeated... All you needed was luck and cunning and boldness. She did not understand that there was no such thing as happiness, that the only victory lay in the far future, long after you were dead."

Archivist
Together with David Astor and Richard Rees, George Orwell's literary executor, Brownell established the George Orwell Archive at University College London, which opened in 1960.

Brownell was fiercely protective of Orwell's estate and edited, with Ian Angus, The Collected Essays, Journalism and Letters of George Orwell (4 volumes, Secker & Warburg, London, 1968).

After Orwell
Brownell married Michael Pitt-Rivers in 1958, and had affairs with several British painters, including Lucian Freud, William Coldstream and Victor Pasmore. Her marriage to Pitt-Rivers ended in divorce in 1965. She also had an affair with the French phenomenological philosopher Maurice Merleau-Ponty, whom she described as her true love; she hoped he would leave his wife for her.

Brownell had several godchildren and was very close to some of them. Her godson Tom Gross has written in The Spectator magazine that "although Sonia had no children of her own, she became almost like a second mother to me."

Sonia was also close friends with many writers and artists, including Pablo Picasso, who drew a sketch in her honor which Picasso marked "Sonia."

Death
Brownell died penniless in London of a brain tumour in December 1980, having spent a fortune trying to protect Orwell's name and having been swindled out of her remaining funds by an unscrupulous accountant.

Her friend, painter Francis Bacon paid off her outstanding debts. At her funeral, Tom Gross read the same passage from Ecclesiastes, chapter 12 verses 1-7 about the breaking of the golden bowl, that she had asked Anthony Powell to read at Orwell's funeral thirty years earlier.

References
Notes

 
Bibliography
  
 .

Further reading
 Sylvia Topp: Eileen : the making of George Orwell, London : Unbound, 2020, 

1918 births
1980 deaths
Deaths from brain cancer in England
People from Kolkata
George Orwell
People educated at Woldingham School
Muses
British people in colonial India